Electro-Shock Blues Show is a live album by Eels released on tour in 2002.

Recording
The fifteen tracks on this album were recorded at six different venues. According to the album's liner notes, the first ten tracks were recorded "somewhere in England" during December 1998 while the Eels were a support act for the band Pulp. The other five tracks are brought in from selected performances from around Europe and the United States:
11 – Groningen, Netherlands, September 30, 1998
12 – Stockholm, Sweden, October 5, 1998
13–14 – Paris, France, September 21, 1998
15 – Indianapolis, Indiana, United States, October 29, 1998

Track listing
"Cancer for the Cure" (E, Mickey Petralia) – 5:16
"Fingertips Part III" (Paul Clarence, Henry Cosby) – 1:20
"Going to Your Funeral Part I" (E, Parthenon Huxley, Jim Jacobsen) – 3:14
"Efil's God" (E, Mike Simpson) – 3:10
"Souljacker part I" (Butch, E, Adam Siegel) – 4:30
"My Beloved Monster" (E) – 2:32
"Novocaine for the Soul" (E, Mark Goldenberg) – 4:22
"Not Ready Yet" (Jon Brion, E) – 12:58
"Last Stop: This Town" (E, Mike Simpson) – 2:52
"Everything's Gonna Be Cool This Christmas" (E) – 3:00
"Flower" (E, Jim Jacobsen) – 3:26
"Dead of Winter" (E) – 3:21
"Electro-Shock Blues" (E, Petralia) – 3:35
"The Medication Is Wearing Off" (E, Petralia) – 4:14
"Climbing to the Moon"/"My Beloved Monster"/"My Girl" (E/E/Smokey Robinson, Ronald White) – 15:05

The last track features a hidden bonus song, another version of "My Beloved Monster", which follows a long silence after the end of "Climbing to the Moon"; the track then segues into The Temptations' classic soul hit "My Girl". However, during the chorus, E replaces the words "My girl" with "My beloved monster". The rhythm to the other recording of "My Beloved Monster" is from The Rolling Stones' "(I Can't Get No) Satisfaction", written by Mick Jagger and Keith Richards.

Personnel
Eels
Mark Oliver Everett – Vocals, guitar, and organ
Butch – Drums, backing vocals, lead vocals on "Efil's God"
Adam Siegel – Bass guitar and backing vocals

Additional musicians
Emma, a fan chosen from the crowd – Sleigh bells on "Everything's Gonna Be Cool This Christmas"

Production
E – Production
Peter Keppler – Engineering
Dan Hersch – Mastering

Self-released albums
Eels (band) live albums
2002 live albums
Albums produced by Mark Oliver Everett